The Delinquents were a punk rock band created in Austin, Texas, in the late 1970s. Their first 7-inch vinyl release, "Alien Beach Party", was chosen by New Musical Express as single of the week. They collaborated with the rock critic Lester Bangs and recorded an album as Lester Bangs and the Delinquents titled Jook Savages on the Brazos. They also recorded an album simply called The Delinquents.

References

Punk rock groups from Texas